Mattukkara Velan is a 1970 Indian Tamil-language action drama film directed by Pa. Neelakandhan. It is a remake of the 1966 Kannada film Emme Thammanna. The film stars M. G. Ramachandran, Jayalalithaa and Lakshmi, while S. A. Ashokan was the villain. It was released on 14 January 1970, and ran for 100 days in 16 theatres.

Plot 
Velan  is an innocent villager whose livelihood is rearing cattle and looks God in them. Nagalingham municipal chairman is crooked and cruel, performs many atrocities in the town also involved in anti-social and illegal activities. He has an arrogant daughter Kamala and a good-nurtured son Sundharam. Sundaram always teases and revolts against his father for his evil deeds. Once Velan's cows obstruct Kamala's way, she beats the cattle when Velan becomes furious and beats her in turn but becomes frightened when he learns that Kamala is chairman's daughter. Nagalingham sends his men to kill Velan but Sundharam rescues him and changes his attire as a college student. Meanwhile, Advocate Sattanathan an honest person who always supports the justice, backs the piety and gives a tough fight to Nagalingham. He leads a happy family life with his ideal wife Annapurna and a daughter Radha. Sathiyanadhan fixes his daughter marriage with his childhood friend Sripathi's son Raghu who resembles Velan. On the advice of Sundaram Velan reaches Sattanathan's house, they mistake him as Raghu and highly honors him. Here Velan and Radha fall in love with Radha. Eventually, Raghu arrives to apprentice Sathiyanadhan, he was caught by goons of Nagalingham they take him to Nagalingham's house and beats him. However, Raghu escapes, enters Sattanathan's house where he is surprised to see Velan, explains Raghu about his problem and he understands the fact. Knowing that Velan is in love with Radha he stops and asks him to stay along with him. Now they play a confuse drama without revealing their identity. Meanwhile, Raghu meets Kamala, she again teases him mistaking him as Velan but afterward feels sorry when both of them fall in love. On the other hand, Sundharam loves their maidservant Kaveri. Unfortunately, once Radha witnesses Raghu and Kamala, misunderstands Velan when Raghu turn up affirms the entire story. Hearing it, Sattanathan throws Velan out and decides to make Radha's marriage with Raghu. But Raghu refuses it and says he is going to marry Kamala. Then Narasimha declares Nagalingham as his father's murderer who projected it as a suicide. Listening to it Raghu breakdowns and he also learns that his father gathered pieces of evidence against Nagalingham in a dairy and secured it in a secret place. In that anger, Raghu burst out on Nagalingham, knowing that Raghu is Sripati's son he captivates him and blackmails Sattanathan for the dairy. Immediately, Sattanathan rushes to Nagalingham's house when Nagalingham is about to kill Sattanathan, Velan comes to his protection where he plays a drama as if he has murdered Sathiyanadhan. At this moment, everyone understands Velan's virtue, simultaneously, Raghu is shifted to Nagalingham's den. Ultimately, Velan breaks out dairy's secret, finds the route map to Nagalingham's den, sees the end of him and protects Raghu. Finally, the movie ends on a happy note with the marriages of Velan and Radha, Raghu and Kamala, and Sundharam and Kaveri.

Cast 
M. G. Ramachandran as Velan and Raghu
Jayalalithaa as Velan's lover Radha
Lakshmi as Kamala
S. A. Ashokan as Nagalingam
V. K. Ramasamy as Sattanathan
Cho Ramaswamy as Sundaram
C. R. Parthiban as Sokka, Dupe Police – a syndicate of the Chairman Nagalingam
S. Varalakshmi as Annapurna, Advocate R. K. Sattanadhan's wife
Sachu as Kaveri
Karikol Raju as Victim of Nagalingam
Usilai Mani as Sattanathan's client
S. N. Lakshmi as Raghunath Sabhapathi's mother

Soundtrack 
The music was composed by K. V. Mahadevan, while the lyrics were written by Kannadasan and Vaali.

References

External links 

1970 films
1970s action drama films
1970s Tamil-language films
Films directed by P. Neelakantan
Films scored by K. V. Mahadevan
Indian action drama films
Tamil remakes of Kannada films